Alexander Porter (born 13 May 1996) is an Australian professional racing cyclist. Porter qualified for the Tokyo 2020 Olympics and was part of the Men's team pursuit together with Kelland O'Brien, Sam Weisford and Leigh Howard. They secured a bronze medal after overlapping New Zealand who had crashed. Porter also competed in the Men's Madison where the team finished fifth with a time of 3:48.448 and therefore did not qualify for the final.

Porter rode in the men's team pursuit at the 2016 UCI Track Cycling World Championships winning a gold medal.

Major results

Track

2014
 1st  Team pursuit, UCI Junior Track World Championships
 Oceania Junior Track Championships
1st  Scratch race
2nd  Omnium
 2nd  Scratch race, Oceania Track Championships
2015
 1st  Team pursuit, National Track Championships
 UCI Track World Cup
1st Team pursuit, Hong Kong
3rd Team pursuit, Cali
2016
 1st  Team pursuit, UCI Track World Championships
 Oceania Track Championships
1st  Scratch race
1st  Team pursuit
 1st  Team pursuit, National Track Championships
2017
 1st  Team pursuit, UCI Track World Championships
2018
 1st  Team pursuit, Commonwealth Games
 UCI Track World Cup
1st Team pursuit, Berlin
 Oceania Track Championships
1st  Madison
2nd  Points race
2019
 1st  Team pursuit, UCI Track World Championships
 UCI Track World Cup
1st Team pursuit, Brisbane
2nd Team pursuit, Cambridge
2021
 3rd  Team pursuit, Summer Olympics

Road
2016
 1st Stage 3 Tour of the Great South Coast
 2nd Overall Tour of the King Valley
2017
 National Under-23 Road Championships
1st  Criterium
2nd Road race
3rd Time trial
 4th Time trial, National Road Championships

References

External links
 

1996 births
Living people
Australian male cyclists
Place of birth missing (living people)
UCI Track Cycling World Champions (men)
Cyclists at the 2018 Commonwealth Games
Commonwealth Games medallists in cycling
Commonwealth Games gold medallists for Australia
Australian track cyclists
Olympic cyclists of Australia
Cyclists at the 2020 Summer Olympics
Olympic bronze medalists for Australia
Olympic medalists in cycling
Medalists at the 2020 Summer Olympics
Cyclists from Adelaide
Medallists at the 2018 Commonwealth Games